Bongi is a unisex South African given name that may refer to
Bongi Makeba (1950–1985), South African singer-songwriter
Bongi Mbonambi (born 1991), South African rugby union footballer
Bongi Ndaba (born 1972), South African producer and writer for television, actress and playwright
Bongi Ntuli (born 1991), South African football striker
Bongi Sithole, South African member of the African National Congress

See also 
Bonci